Haughney is a surname. Notable people with the surname include:

Mick Haughney (died 2006), Irish footballer
Mike Haughney (1925–2002), Scottish footballer
Paul Haughney (born 1991), Irish hurler

See also
Haughey
Haughley (surname)

Surnames of Irish origin